Jonathan Dwight Jones (born July 19, 1987) is an American professional mixed martial artist currently signed to the Ultimate Fighting Championship (UFC), where he is the current UFC Heavyweight Champion. He is a former two-time UFC Light Heavyweight Champion, holding the title from March 2011 to April 2015 and from December 2018 to August 2020. Jones also held the interim UFC Light Heavyweight Championship in 2016. As of March 7, 2023, he is #1 in the UFC men's pound-for-pound rankings.

Jones became the youngest champion in UFC history with his title victory over Maurício Rua at age 23. He holds many UFC records in the light heavyweight division, including the most title defenses, most wins, and longest win streak. During much of his championship reign, Jones has been widely considered to be the best pound-for-pound fighter in the world. Never stopped nor outscored during his career, Jones's only professional loss is a controversial disqualification against Matt Hamill; a result that Hamill and UFC President Dana White dispute.

Between 2015 and 2017, Jones was involved in several controversies and lost his title three times as a result of disciplinary action. He was first stripped of his title and removed from the official rankings by the UFC in 2015 after he was arrested on felony hit-and-run charges. His subsequent returns to the UFC in 2016 and 2017 saw him emerge victorious in title bouts against Ovince Saint Preux and Daniel Cormier, but were both cut short by Jones testing positive for banned substances and receiving further suspensions, with the latter reversed to a 'no contest'. After his 2017 suspension was lifted, Jones reclaimed the championship in 2018 by defeating Alexander Gustafsson. He voluntarily vacated the title in 2020 amid a pay dispute with White and cited intent to move up to heavyweight. In 2023, after over three years off, Jones returned and won the UFC Heavyweight Championship after defeating Ciryl Gane.

Early life 
Jones was born on July 19, 1987 in Rochester, New York.  His father Arthur is a pastor at Mount Sinai Church of God in Christ in Binghamton, New York. Arthur discouraged Jon's fighting career, "I wanted him to preach. I tried to discourage him from being a fighter. I told him you don't want to do that. You can do other things. Be a pastor." Jon's mother, Camille, died in 2017 at the age of 55, after a long battle with diabetes.

Jon was one of four children. His older brother, Arthur, is a former American football defensive lineman who played for the Baltimore Ravens, Indianapolis Colts and Washington Redskins, while his younger brother, Chandler, is an outside linebacker for the Las Vegas Raiders. His older sister, Carmen, died of a brain tumor before her 18th birthday.

Mixed martial arts career

Early career
Before beginning his MMA career, Jones was a stand-out high school wrestler and state champion at Union-Endicott High School in upstate New York. He also played football as a defensive lineman; due to his slight frame, his coach nicknamed him "Bones". Jones won a NJCAA national championship at Iowa Central Community College. After transferring to Morrisville State College to study Criminal Justice, he dropped out of college to begin his MMA career.

Jones made his professional MMA debut in April 2008. He amassed an undefeated record of 6–0 over a period of three months, finishing all of his opponents. In his last bout before signing with the UFC, Jones defeated Moyses Gabin at BCX 5 for the USKBA Light Heavyweight Championship. He won the fight via TKO in the second round.

Ultimate Fighting Championship

Debut and rise to contender status
Jones made his UFC debut against Andre Gusmão at UFC 87 on August 9, 2008. Jones had accepted the deal on two weeks' notice as a late replacement for Tomasz Drwal. Jones won via unanimous decision (30–27, 29–28, and 30–27), using takedowns and unorthodox striking, such as spinning elbows and a spinning back kick.

In his second UFC match, Jones took on veteran Stephan Bonnar at UFC 94 on January 31, 2009. Jones secured multiple takedowns on Bonnar, even suplexing him to the mat, and connecting with a back elbow that hurt Bonnar badly. He appeared fatigued in the third round but won the fight by unanimous decision.

Jones's third fight was against Jake O'Brien at UFC 100 on July 11, 2009. Jones controlled the majority of the match and eventually secured a modified guillotine choke, causing O'Brien to tap out. In September 2009, Jones was rewarded for his victories by signing a new, four-fight contract with the UFC.

On December 5, 2009, Jones fought fellow light heavyweight prospect Matt Hamill at The Ultimate Fighter: Heavyweights Finale. Jones used his wrestling to dominate Hamill, dislocating Hamill's shoulder with a takedown, and battering him with strikes. However Jones would be disqualified for the use of illegal 12-6 elbows. The Unified Rules of Mixed Martial Arts prohibited downward elbow strikes, and Jones was initially only penalized a point from the round. However Hamill was unable to continue due to his dislocated shoulder. Consequently, the replay simulation was reviewed, and showed that Jones's elbows further damaged Hamill's already bloody and lacerated nose. This marked the first time that Nevada has used its recently enacted instant replay rule, in which the referee's decision was supported by the commission, which utilized a slow-motion replay to review the elbows. UFC president Dana White was aggrieved that referee Steve Mazagatti ruled the bout as a loss for Jones, saying that it should have been a no contest. In 2019, White said he was still attempting to have the result overturned to a no contest by the Nevada State Athletic Commission.

Jones fought Brandon Vera on March 21, 2010, at UFC Live: Vera vs. Jones. He won the fight by TKO after an elbow to Vera's face followed up with various punches in the first round. The elbow delivered to stop the fight also broke Vera's face in three places. Jones also won the "Knockout of the Night" award.

Jones defeated former IFL Light Heavyweight Champion Vladimir Matyushenko by TKO with elbows in 1:52 of the first round on August 1, 2010, at UFC Live: Jones vs. Matyushenko. Dana White promised Jones a "huge step-up in the competition", if he managed to defeat Matyushenko. Following the match with Matyushenko, White said, "Vladimir Matyushenko is a guy who I have a lot of respect for and I didn't think it was going to happen that easy. Jones is the real deal and he just catapulted himself tonight into the top eight in the world. Tonight solidified it. ... He's got to keep his head together, stay focused and keep doing all the right things in training. He's smart, good looking and bad-ass. He's going to make a lot of money -- this kid is going to do very well."

After defeating Matyushenko, Jones stated that he wanted a "top-three opponent" for his next fight. Jones mentioned in an interview with Inside MMA that he would be facing the winner of Antônio Rogério Nogueira vs. Ryan Bader. Reports that Jones had previously been offered a match with Nogueira, but turned it down, turned out to be false. In the Inside MMA interview, Jones also stated that he had been informed by Dana White and Lorenzo Fertitta that if he finished his next two fights, he would likely receive a title shot.

White soon confirmed that Jones would face the undefeated Ultimate Fighter winner Ryan Bader, on February 5, 2011, at UFC 126. Jones handed Bader his first professional loss by defeating him via submission due to a guillotine choke in the second round after dominating Bader in the first round. Jones was awarded the "Submission of the Night" bonus.

Light Heavyweight Champion
Immediately after the bout with Bader, it was revealed that title contender and Jones's training partner Rashad Evans had sustained a knee injury in training, and would not be able to compete in his scheduled match with UFC light heavyweight champion Maurício "Shogun" Rua. Jones was told by Joe Rogan in the post-fight interview that he would replace Evans in the fight for the UFC Light Heavyweight Championship. On March 19, 2011, at UFC 128, Jones defeated Rua by TKO at 2:37 of Round 3, becoming the youngest ever UFC champion. After an early flying knee that badly hurt the champion, Shogun was dominated throughout the three rounds. A body shot and knee to the head dropped the champion to his knees, causing the referee to step in and halt the match.

Jones's first title defense was expected to be on August 6, 2011, at UFC 133 against Rashad Evans, his former friend and teammate, but Jones was sidelined with a hand injury. It was initially announced that the hand injury would require surgery, but Jones opted for rest and rehabilitation without surgery after further consultations with doctors. Jones's injury was originally thought to keep him out of action until late 2011, but he instead made his first title defense against Quinton Jackson on September 24, 2011, at UFC 135. Jones defeated Jackson via rear naked choke submission at 1:14 in the 4th round. In the process, he became the first UFC fighter to submit Jackson. In 2012, Jones said that this was his favorite fight up to that point.

Jones vs. Evans was in the works for a second time, and a bout was targeted for December 10, 2011, at UFC 140. However, a lingering thumb injury cost another title opportunity for Evans, and Jones instead faced Lyoto Machida at the same event.
Despite getting rocked in the first round by Machida, Jones successfully defended the light heavyweight title at UFC 140, stopping Machida at 4:26 of the second round via guillotine choke technical submission, which caused Machida to collapse unconscious along the cage. This was the first submission loss in Machida's career.

Jones finally faced his arch rival and former teammate Rashad Evans on April 21, 2012, at UFC 145, and won via unanimous decision (49–46, 49–46, and 50–45). During the UFC 145 post fight press conference, Dana White confirmed that Jones's next opponent would be Dan Henderson. The Jones-Henderson fight was expected to take place at UFC 151, but Henderson pulled out of the bout due to injuries. Jones then refused a late replacement fight with Chael Sonnen after his coach Greg Jackson told him with three training days left, it would be pretty difficult to prepare. UFC 151 was then subsequently cancelled. It was later reported that Henderson was injured three weeks prior to the announcement, but kept the injury under wraps as he was still hoping to compete. However, he had to withdraw following a final sparring session to evaluate his condition.

Jones decision to decline the fight against Sonnen was criticized. In the 19-year history of the UFC, it was the first card to ever be canceled. UFC president Dana White went on record saying, "this is one of the most selfish, disgusting decisions that doesn't just affect you. This is affecting 16 other lives, their families, kids are going back to school. The list goes on and on of all the things, the money that was spent for fighters to train and the list goes on and on. Like I said, I don't think this is going to make Jon Jones popular with the fans, sponsors, cable distributors, television network executives or other fighters."

A rematch with Lyoto Machida was then announced for September 22, 2012, at UFC 152. Lyoto Machida, who was not contacted prior to the announcement, rejected the fight due to the lack of time to train before the bout. Jones, instead, defended the championship against Vitor Belfort on September 22, 2012, at UFC 152. Jones opened as a massive favorite (13-to-1) coming into the bout.  Despite almost being submitted via armbar in round one, Jones successfully defended the belt against Belfort via Americana submission in round four, and equaled Chuck Liddell's number of title defenses. Jones also won a $65,000 Submission of the Night bonus for his finish of Belfort.

Jones was chosen to coach opposite Chael Sonnen on Season 17 of the Ultimate Fighter. With a bout between the coaches taking place on April 27, 2013, at UFC 159.
Jones displayed a lack of interest in the bout and actively downplayed the contest, making it clear that he did not believe Sonnen was a fit contender. In an interview, Sonnen did his best to garner interest in the bout, but Jones gave him the "silent treatment", and refused to make eye contact. Jones made quick work of his challenger, finishing Sonnen via TKO in the first round. However, he broke the phalanx (big toe) on his left foot during the fight. With the win, Jones tied Tito Ortiz for having most consecutive title defenses in UFC light heavyweight history.

Jones faced Alexander Gustafsson on September 21, 2013, at UFC 165. Jones was badly cut above the eye during the first round, but he won the back-and-forth fight via unanimous decision (48–47, 48–47, and 49–46). After the match, Jones said Gustafsson gave him the toughest fight of his career, and both were sent to the hospital for their injuries. Both men suffered lacerations and facial swelling, but were released from the hospital with no broken bones or serious injuries. The bout earned both fighters the Fight of the Night bonus award. The match received numerous positive reviews: "an epic battle", "instant-classic", "Fight of the Year", "Greatest light heavyweight title fight of all-time", "one of the greatest fights in UFC history". On March 8, 2020, it was announced that the fight will be inducted to UFC Hall of Fame's Fight Wing on July 9.

Jones was expected to take on Glover Teixeira on February 1, 2014, at UFC 169. However, on October 7, UFC President Dana White stated that the announcement for this fight on that card was premature and that Jones and Teixeira would face each other on a different card. On November 13, 2013, it was announced that Jones would fight Teixeira at UFC 170, scheduled for February 22, 2014, however the next day it was announced that the match had been removed from the card. On December 4, 2013, it was announced that Jones and Teixeira would face each other at UFC 171 on March 15, 2014, in Dallas, Texas, however, the fight was moved again. Jones and Teixeira finally fought on April 26, 2014, at UFC 172.
Jones won the bout via unanimous decision (50–45, 50–45, and 50–45).

On April 27, 2014, UFC President Dana White confirmed that Jones would next have a rematch against Gustafsson, and stated the possibility of the match taking place in a stadium in Sweden on pay-per-view. On May 24, 2014, it was indicated that the rematch would take place in Las Vegas on August 30, 2014, at UFC 177. The statement, and the time and venue, was not official however, because Gustafsson was the only one who still had agreed to accept the match. On June 2, the fight was still on hold, and White explained the situation as "Jones doesn't want to fight Gustafsson", and instead expressed his preference for fighting Daniel Cormier.

On June 5, 2014, the UFC confirmed that the Jones vs. Gustafsson rematch would take place on September 27, 2014, at UFC 178. However, Gustafsson had to pull out of the match due to a torn meniscus. Jones was then expected to take on replacement Daniel Cormier at UFC 178. On August 12, 2014, it was announced that Jones had sustained a leg injury in training, causing him to withdraw. The bout was rescheduled, and eventually took place on January 3, 2015, at UFC 182. Jones won the fight by unanimous decision (49–46, 49–46, and 49–46). He also became the first person to take Cormier down, scoring three takedowns in total. The win also earned Jones his fourth Fight of the Night bonus award. It was later revealed that Jones had failed a drug test one month prior to the event, as he tested positive for cocaine. (see below in Controversies)

First suspension and return
Jones was expected to defend his title against Anthony Johnson on May 23, 2015, at UFC 187. However, on April 28, Jones was stripped of the belt and suspended from the UFC indefinitely in connection with a hit-and-run incident where he crashed into a pregnant woman then fled the scene on foot. Cormier, who lost against Jones at UFC 182 in January 2015, replaced him and went on to defeat Anthony Johnson to take the vacant UFC Light Heavyweight Championship.

On October 23, 2015, the UFC announced that Jones had been reinstated to the active roster, nearly six months after his suspension was announced. A rematch with Cormier was expected to take place on April 23, 2016, at UFC 197. However, Cormier pulled out of the fight on April 1, citing a foot injury, and was replaced by Ovince Saint Preux. Jones defeated Saint Preux by unanimous decision (50–44, 50–45, and 50–45).

Second suspension and return
The rematch with Cormier was rescheduled and expected to take place on July 9, 2016, at UFC 200. However, on July 6, 2016, Jones was removed from the bout by USADA on June 16 after a potential doping violation. On November 7, 2016, it was announced that Jones had been suspended for one year by USADA, retroactive to July 7. Two days later, it was announced that Jones had been stripped of his interim title, making him the first fighter in UFC history to be stripped of a title twice. On December 15, Jones was also suspended by the Nevada State Athletic Commission (NSAC) for one year.

While on the sidelines, Jones fought retired MMA veteran Dan Henderson in a grappling match for the Submission Underground 2 tournament on December 14, 2016. After an even start, Jones eventually submitted Henderson with an arm-triangle choke six minutes into the bout. Following the fight, Jones expressed interest in competing against Chael Sonnen.

Third suspension and return
The rematch with Daniel Cormier took place on July 29, 2017, at UFC 214 at the Honda Center in Anaheim, California. Jones won the fight and re-captured the UFC Light Heavyweight Championship via knockout in the third round. After the fight, Jones was awarded a Performance of the Night bonus. After the fight, Jones praised Cormier as a "model champion", while recognizing his own personal failings. He then challenged Brock Lesnar to a fight.

On August 22, it was announced that Jones had been flagged for a potential doping violation by USADA, stemming from his sample that was collected after weigh-ins July 28. He tested positive for Turinabol, an anabolic steroid. Jones was placed on a provisional suspension as a result. On September 13, USADA confirmed that both the "A" and "B" sample of Jones' tested positive for Turinabol. As a result, the California State Athletic Commission (CSAC) officially overturned the result of the fight to a no contest. Subsequently, UFC President Dana White made the decision to strip him of the Light Heavyweight championship, and return it to Daniel Cormier.

In September 2018, it was announced by USADA that Jones would serve a suspension of 15 months. From a potential suspension of 48 months USADA applied a reduction of 30 months for Jones's co-operation in identifying other anti-doping offences, and a further 3 months was applied by arbitrators McLaren in relation to Jones's degree of fault.

Second UFC Light Heavyweight Championship reign
On October 10, 2018, it was announced that Jones would return at UFC 232 on December 29, 2018, in a rematch with Alexander Gustafsson for the vacant UFC Light Heavyweight Championship. Jones defeated Gustafsson by technical knockout in the third round to win the UFC Light Heavyweight Championship.

In the first defense of his second championship reign, Jones faced Anthony Smith on March 2, 2019, in the main event at UFC 235. Jones dominated the fight, but was deducted two points in the fourth round after landing an illegal knee to Smith's head. He won the fight via unanimous decision with 48–44 on all three judges' scorecards.

Jones faced Thiago Santos on July 6, 2019, in the main event at UFC 239. He won the back-and-forth match via split decision (48–47, 47–48, and 48–47), defending his title for the second time.

Jones faced Dominick Reyes on February 8, 2020 in the main event of UFC 247. Jones won the fight via controversial unanimous decision (48–47, 48–47, and 49–46). 14 of 21 media outlets scored the contest for Reyes, while only 7 scored it for Jones. With this win, Jones set the new record for most wins in UFC title fight history with 14 wins.

Disagreement with the UFC and move to heavyweight 
After conflict with UFC President Dana White over pay in May 2020, Jones said he had vacated the UFC Light Heavyweight Championship. Jones was targeting a fight with heavyweight contender Francis Ngannou and according to White wanted "Deontay Wilder money", referring to Wilder's reported $25–30 million earnings in his rematch with Tyson Fury held in February 2020. On August 15, 2020, Jones announced on social media that he would be relinquishing the Light Heavyweight Championship, as well expressing his desire to move up to heavyweight.

After over three years removed from his last bout, Jones faced Ciryl Gane for the vacant UFC Heavyweight Championship on March 4, 2023, at UFC 285.  He won the bout and earned the title via a guillotine choke submission in the first round. After the fight, Jones earned the Performance of the Night bonus award.

Training

Jones has trained with Team BombSquad out of Cortland, New York, then briefly with the Tristar Gym in Montreal, Canada and most recently at Jackson's MMA in Albuquerque, New Mexico. He also trained as a power-lifter during his suspension from the UFC.

Fighting style

Jones stands out by his high adaptability and flawless technique in the cage and has been described as "one of the most dynamic, innovative, and constantly evolving fighters in the history of MMA" and "perhaps the greatest martial artist ever to step into an octagon". Jones capitalizes on his great range and defensive wrestling to land blows in a creative, unorthodox style.

He employs a diverse kicking technique, favoring front kicks to the body and head, roundhouse kicks to the legs and upper body, and his most known technique, the "oblique kick", a controversial move that targets his opponent's knee. The oblique kick was a technique popularized by Bruce Lee, who Jones cited as an inspiration. Jones also excels in the clinch, where he is skilled at controlling his opponent's arms and scoring elbow and knee strikes. On the ground, he has excellent positional control and an ability to find openings for punches and elbow strikes.

Personal life
Jones and his fiancée Jessie have three daughters: Leah, born in 2008; Carmen Nicole, born in 2009; and Olivia Haven born in 2013. In an interview with Joe Rogan on December 1, 2016, Jones stated that he has four daughters (aged 9, 8, 6 and 3), indicating a daughter born before Leah. On February 23, 2022, Jones announced via Twitter that his fiancée had left him around two months prior. The two have since reconciled, and Jessie accompanied Jones into the cage after he won the heavyweight title at UFC 285 on March 4, 2023. 

Jones is a Christian.

Jones claimed that he was sexually assaulted as a child.

On March 19, 2011, Jones was en route to Great Falls Historic Park in Paterson, New Jersey, where he planned to meditate several hours ahead of his fight against Maurício "Shogun" Rua at UFC 128. He was accompanied by his coaches Mike Winkeljohn and Greg Jackson. As their driver prepared to drop them off, Jones observed an elderly couple screaming for help. The woman informed Winkeljohn that a man had smashed her car window and had run off with her GPS. Jones, along with his two coaches, chased after the robber, caught and tripped him, and held him down until the police arrived.

On August 8, 2012, Jones became the first mixed martial artist to be sponsored by Nike on an international scale. He is also the first MMA fighter to have his own shoe line, and the first MMA fighter to represent Gatorade and MuscleTech in the Octagon. On December 16, 2014, Jones announced that he had signed a sponsorship deal with Reebok. However, on April 29, 2015, Reebok terminated their sponsorship following Jones's involvement in a hit-and-run incident. A day later, Jones also lost his sponsorship with MuscleTech.

Controversies

Eye pokes
Jones has been criticized for repeatedly poking his opponents in the eyes. In response to the criticism, Jones released a video on Instagram in April 2014 in which he mocked fans by simulating crying and saying "Jones put his finger in his eye. Dirtiest fighter in MMA." After backlash towards the post, Jones deleted it from his account.

When asked about the controversy, UFC president Dana White stated, "we've got to stop that stuff. The openings of the hands and putting the hands on the face are something bad, but it happens with guys who have reach. They do that a lot." White clarified his position in another interview, saying, "It's not just taller fighters. Jones has that range and he can do it, but lots of guys do it because that's how you block punches. So you keep your hands open and you slap punches down. Then guys are rushing in and you're doing whatever, and guys get poked in the eyes." White also noted that in the fight against Glover Teixeira, after Jones was warned about the behavior, he was more careful to avoid any eye pokes throughout the rest of the match, a move he claimed Jones "would not [be] credited for" from detractors.

Jones later said in an interview, "I realize that I do it. I realize the criticism that I got from it. It's not on purpose. If you watch my fights, it's me extending my arm in a reactionary way. I do put a hand on people's foreheads to maintain distance. That's what you saw [against] Teixeira, but to say I am purposely poking people in the eye, it's just inaccurate."

Daniel Cormier altercation
During a promotional event for UFC 178, on August 4, 2014, Jones and Daniel Cormier briefly scuffled during an on-stage staredown, initiated by Jones pressing his forehead against Cormier's forehead, prompting Cormier to shove Jones by the throat, to which Jones responded by throwing a punch. Both fighters were restrained by coaches and event organizers. UFC chief legal officer Kirk Hendrick said "there are going to be ramifications". In addition, the Nevada State Athletic Commission requested a video copy of the altercation. On September 23, 2014, Jones was fined $50,000 and was ordered to undergo 40 hours of community service by the Nevada Athletic Commission. During the disciplinary hearing, Jones claimed to have lost a six-figure endorsement deal with Nike, but later admitted to fabricating the statement.

Hit-and-run conviction
On April 27, 2015, Albuquerque, New Mexico police stated that Jones was sought in connection with a hit and run early the previous morning. Jones was alleged to have run a red light and crashed his rental car in a collision involving two other vehicles. Jones allegedly fled the scene of the crash on foot, leaving an injured pregnant woman behind in another vehicle. The incident was witnessed by an off-duty police officer who identified the suspect as an African-American man, wearing a white shirt and dark pants, whom he believed to be Jones. According to witnesses, the man described as Jones then returned to the scene to grab cash from the vehicle before fleeing again. Paperwork found in the rental car was under the name of "Jonathan Jones". Inside the silver Buick SUV, law enforcement found a pipe with marijuana inside of it. Though initially wanted for questioning that could have resulted in a simple misdemeanor, Jones's charges were elevated to a felony on April 27 for injuring a person and purposely leaving the scene of an accident.

An arrest warrant was issued against Jones, and surrender arrangements were made between law enforcement and Jones's lawyers. That evening, Jones turned himself in to the Albuquerque Police Department. Later that evening, he posted bail of $2,500 and left the Bernalillo County Metro Detention Center. He made a court appearance on April 28 and did not enter a plea. The judge lifted any travel restrictions, and Jones was allowed to remain free, as long as he remained in contact with his lawyer, and followed certain conditions. With a pending UFC fight still in his contract, UFC President Dana White and Zuffa owner Lorenzo Fertitta traveled to New Mexico from Las Vegas to meet with Jones in person. That same day, the UFC stripped Jones of the title, removed him from official rankings, and suspended him indefinitely. In a statement released that day, the UFC announced that Jones was stripped from his belt for violating the Athlete Code of Conduct Policy.

Jones apologized to his fans on Twitter by saying, "Got a lot of soul searching to do. Sorry to everyone I've let down." On September 29, 2015, he pleaded guilty to leaving the scene of an accident and was subsequently sentenced to up to 18 months of supervised probation. He was authorized to travel for work-related purposes. Jones met all of the conditions, which included 72 separate appearances for charity or youth outreach, avoiding a felony charge on his criminal record. In an interview in December 2016, Jones admitted he had run from the scene of the accident and had not checked on the occupant of the other vehicle.

Domestic violence arrest

In the early hours of September 24, 2021, a day after Jones was inducted into the UFC Hall of Fame for his fight with Alexander Gustafsson at UFC 165, police were called to the Caesars Palace resort hotel in Las Vegas, Nevada, responding to a domestic incident. According to a police report obtained by news site MMA Fighting, a 911 call was made by a hotel security guard when Jones' youngest daughter requested help, claiming there was a domestic incident between Jones and his fiancée, Jessie Moses. Cops arrived in minutes, cutting Jones off as he was attempting to flee the scene. Officers detained Jones and began to investigate the situation. While officers detained Jones, others went to the room to further investigate and get Moses' side of the story. When they arrived to the room, they observed her with blood on her face and clothing, and with a bump on her lip, consistent with someone who had been struck. Moses stated that Jones had left the hotel to go out with friends while Moses and their children went to sleep, and that when Jones returned, he was belligerent, became agitated, and pulled her hair. She claims that the hair pulling was the extent of the physicality between the two, and claimed that the blood on her face and clothing was from chapped lips. She also declined a temporary protective order against Jones. Police stated that while he was being detained, a belligerent Jones headbutted the hood of the patrol vehicle, leaving a dent, they claimed Jones had made threats and challenged the arresting officers to a fight, and that Jones had said he could break free from the handcuffs. No attempts at a fight were followed through on, however, and Jones was placed under arrest peacefully after the investigation concluded. He was taken to the Clark County jail where he was charged with one count of domestic battery, a misdemeanor, and one count of tampering with a police vehicle, a felony. His bail was set at $16,000. Jones posted bail approximately twelve hours after his arrest and was due to be arraigned in court on October 26. Four days after his arrest, Jones posted an Instagram video of himself lifting weights, with the caption saying “I have way too much trauma to consume alcohol, my brain simply can't handle it anymore. I will leave alcohol in my past forever.” Three weeks after the arrest, Jones was banned from entering Jackson Wink MMA gym by his coach, Mike Winkeljohn, where Jones had been training since 2009. On December 16, it was revealed that the domestic battery charge against Jones was dropped. As for the felony tampering with a police vehicle charge, Jones pleaded no contest and was ordered to pay $750 in restitution, attend anger management therapy, and was given a court order to stay out of any and all legal trouble.

Other legal troubles
In the early morning of May 19, 2012, Jones drove his Bentley Continental GT into a pole in Binghamton, New York. Jones was arrested for driving under the influence and was bailed out by his mother. He pleaded guilty to DUI charges and was order to pay a $1,000 fine, install ignition interlocks on all of his vehicles, complete a victims impact class, and had his driver's license suspended for six months.

On July 21, 2019, it was reported that Jones had been charged with battery for an alleged incident in April 2019 involving a cocktail waitress at a strip club in Albuquerque. The waitress claimed that Jones slapped her, put her in a choke hold and kissed her on the neck, and touched her after she had asked him to stop. The bench trial of the case was held on September 26, 2019, where Jones pleaded no contest to the charges and received a 90-day deferred sentence whereby he must avoid arrest, not violate the law, consume no alcohol or drugs and not return to the scene. He was also ordered to pay court fees during his unsupervised probation period, as per the court document.

Jones was arrested in the early morning of March 26, 2020 in Albuquerque, New Mexico. According to police reports, an Albuquerque PD officer heard what sounded to be a gunshot and, upon further investigation, observed a black Jeep with Jones in the driver's seat. After noticing signs of intoxication, the responding officer administered a field sobriety test, which Jones failed. Jones was also given a breathalyzer test and registered a BAC more than twice the legal limit. Police then searched Jones' vehicle while arresting him for DWI and found a partially empty bottle of Recuerdo Mezcal as well as a black handgun underneath the driver's seat. Jones was arrested on the scene and taken to the Bernalillo County jail. Altogether, Jones was charged with aggravated DWI, negligent use of a firearm, possession of an open container, and driving with no proof of insurance. On March 31, it was announced that Jones had pleaded guilty to the DWI charge, after accepting a plea deal in which the other charges would be dropped. He was sentenced to four days house arrest, one year of supervised probation, a minimum of 90 days of outpatient therapy, and he must complete 48 hours of community service.

Failed drug tests

UFC 182
On January 6, 2015, it was announced that Jones failed a drug test prior to UFC 182. He tested positive for benzoylecgonine, the primary metabolite of cocaine. Because benzoylecgonine is not banned out-of-competition by the World Anti-Doping Agency, the NSAC could not halt Jones from participating during UFC 182. He was randomly tested on December 3, 2014, and results came back on December 23, 2014. A week after his first test, Jones was tested again. He passed the second test, which meant that the cocaine metabolite was out of his system before the fight. When the news was made public, Jones went into rehab for one night. He was fined $25,000 on January 17 for violating the UFC's Athlete Code of Conduct policy. On January 19, 2015, Jones was interviewed for the first time since the failed drug test and said: "...I'm not a cocaine addict by any means or not even a frequent user. I just made a really dumb decision and got caught with my pants down in this whole situation."

Prior to his UFC 182 bout with Cormier, Jones's testosterone/epitestosterone (T/E) ratio was considered by some experts to be alarmingly low. Victor Conte, a former steroid distributor, who founded and led the Bay Area Laboratory Co-operative (BALCO), said of Jones's test "these (levels) are highly suspicious for Jon Jones, in my opinion. This is the reason that sophisticated anti-doping officials do target testing. So based on what we see here, my opinion is Jon Jones should be on a very short leash and should be random tested here until they sort out why he has these anomalies." This resulted in several journalists imploring the NSAC to utilize CIR (Carbon Isotope Ratio) testing on Jones's samples. "Luckily, this is a situation where speculation could quickly be ended. Jon Jones' drug test samples still exist and a simple Carbon Isotope Ratio test could be conducted to find the result. Put simply, a CIR test would be able to determine if the testosterone in Jones' system was synthetic or natural," Brent Brookhouse of Bloody Elbow wrote. However, according to NSAC executive director Bob Bennett, Jones' test samples had already undergone CIR testing by the same WADA-accredited lab which had reported his T/E ratios, noting that all CIR results came back clean. Additionally, he said there were three different types of tests done during each of the random tests: urine, blood testing for human growth hormone and a blood passport test. "The only negative was testing positive for cocaine metabolites," Bennett said.

UFC 200
On July 8, 2016, a urine sample from Jones tested positive for two banned substances, clomiphene, an anti-estrogen substance, and letrozole, an aromatase inhibitor, prior to his scheduled championship bout with Cormier at UFC 200. The violation was from an "A" sample collection on June 16, with subsequent testing of the B sample confirming the doping. Both drugs, which are on the World Anti-Doping Agency banned substances list, are described as "hormone and metabolic modulators", which are not allowed to be used in or out of competition. As a result, Jones had to withdraw from the event, and was replaced by former middleweight champion Anderson Silva. Throughout the ordeal, Jones maintained his innocence, claiming that he was the victim of a contaminated product that he believed to be Cialis, which was later independently obtained, tested and found to be contaminated by the United States Anti-Doping Agency. On November 7, 2016, it was announced that Jones was issued a 1-year suspension by USADA following his arbitration hearing, though the panel concluded that Jones did not take the banned substances intentionally, and was not a drug cheat.

UFC 214
On August 22, 2017, it was announced that Jones was flagged for a potential doping violation by USADA, stemming from his test sample that was collected on July 28, one day before his rematch against Cormier at UFC 214. He tested positive for Turinabol, an anabolic steroid, and was placed on a provisional suspension as a result of the positive drug test. On September 13, the CSAC announced that it had overturned the result of the fight with Cormier from a KO victory for Jones to a no-contest, after both Jones's A and B samples tested positive for Turinabol. Jones was also stripped of the title for a third time, and it was then returned to Cormier.

Jones stated that he did not knowingly take any prohibited substances, with his team believing Jones consumed tainted substances. Jones potentially faced up to a 4-year suspension if found guilty, but on September 18 he was handed a 15-month suspension by USADA, retroactive to July 28, plus three months community service. 30 months were deducted from the 4-year suspension because Jones provided "substantial assistance" to USADA. "Substantial assistance" refers to an athlete informing an anti-doping agency about a doping violation by another athlete. USADA said it reduced the suspension by a further three months after a hearing with an independent arbitrator, Richard McLaren, on September 15. Travis Tygart, CEO of USADA, said in a statement: "The independent arbitrator found that Jon Jones was not intentionally cheating in this case, and while we thought 18-months was the appropriate sanction given the other circumstances of the case, we respect the arbitrator's decision and believe that justice was served. This case is another strong reminder that athletes need to be extremely cautious about the products and supplements they use to ensure they are free of prohibited substances."

UFC 232
Jones became eligible to fight again on October 28, 2018, and was scheduled to fight against Alexander Gustafsson at UFC 232 in Las Vegas on December 29. However, after further inconsistencies arose with his drug test on December 23, he was not granted a license to compete in Nevada, so the event was moved to Los Angeles. In order to receive a license from CSAC, Jones had to enroll into the VADA (Voluntary Anti-Doping Association) testing program, thus making him the first UFC fighter to be signed to both USADA and VADA testing programs simultaneously. Drug tests administered at UFC 232 found an ultra trace amount of turinabol, which doctors attributed to a long-term "pulsing effect" of the M3 metabolite detected in 2017. CSAC did not take disciplinary action against Jones as the medical experts stated that there was no evidence that Jones had re-administered a banned substance and no performance-enhancing benefits were gained.

Championships and accomplishments

Mixed martial arts
Ultimate Fighting Championship
UFC Heavyweight Championship (one time, current)
UFC Light Heavyweight Championship (two times)
Eleven successful title defenses (overall)
Eight successful title defenses (first reign)
Three successful title defenses (second reign)
Interim UFC Light Heavyweight Championship (one time)
Longest Light Heavyweight champion reign in UFC history (1501 days)
 Eighth multi-divisional champion in UFC history
Longest unbeaten streak in UFC history (19)
Most consecutive wins in the UFC light heavyweight division (13)
Most consecutive title defenses in the UFC light heavyweight division (8)
Most successful title defenses in the UFC light heavyweight division (11)
Tied for most successful title defenses in UFC history (11) (w. Demetrious Johnson)
Most wins in UFC title fights (15)
Most UFC light heavyweight title fights (15)
Most wins in UFC light heavyweight title fights (14)
Most wins in UFC light heavyweight division (20)
Most decision wins in UFC light heavyweight division (10)
Longest total fight time in UFC light heavyweight division history (5:40:15)
Most significant strikes landed in UFC light heavyweight division history (1463)
Most total strikes landed in UFC light heavyweight division history (1835)
Highest takedown defense percentage in UFC light heavyweight division history (95.0%)
Fourth most consecutive title defenses in UFC history (8)
Youngest fighter to win a UFC championship (23 years, 242 days)
 Tied (Charles Oliveira, Dustin Poirier & Rafael dos Anjos) for fifth most wins in UFC history (21)
 Tied (Demetrious Johnson) for third most finishes in UFC title fights (7)
Fight of the Night (four times) vs. Quinton Jackson, Lyoto Machida, Alexander Gustafsson and Daniel Cormier
Knockout of the Night (one time) vs. Brandon Vera
Submission of the Night (two times) vs. Ryan Bader and Vitor Belfort
Performance of the Night (two times) vs. Daniel Cormier and Ciryl Gane
UFC Hall of Fame (Fight Wing) vs. Alexander Gustafsson at UFC 165
United States Kickboxing Association
USKBA Light Heavyweight Championship (one time)
Sherdog
2009 Breakthrough Fighter of the Year
2010 All-Violence 1st Team
2011 All-Violence 1st Team
2011 Beatdown of the Year for win over Maurício Rua
2011 Fighter of the Year
2012 All-Violence 1st Team
2013 All-Violence 1st Team
2013 Fight of the Year (vs Alexander Gustafsson) (UFC 165)
Mixed Martial Arts Hall of Fame
World MMA Awards
2010 Breakthrough Fighter of the Year
2011 Fighter of the Year
2012 Fighter of the Year
2013 Fight of the Year vs. Alexander Gustafsson at UFC 165
CombatPress.com
2018 Biggest Story of the Year (Jon Jones and the Move of UFC 232)
MMA Fighting
2013 Fight of the Year (vs Alexander Gustafsson) (UFC 165)
MMAInsider.net
2013 Fight of the Year (vs Alexander Gustafsson) (UFC 165)
FoxSports.com
2013 Fight of the Year (vs Alexander Gustafsson) (UFC 165)
Yahoo! Sports
2013 Fight of the Year (vs. Alexander Gustafsson) (UFC 165)
MMAWeekly.com
2013 Fight of the Year (vs. Alexander Gustafsson) (UFC 165)
2018 Comeback Fighter of the Year
MMAjunkie.com
2013 Fight of the Year (vs. Alexander Gustafsson) (UFC 165)
2015 January Fight of the Month vs. Daniel Cormier
ESPN
2011 Fighter of the Year
2013 Fight of the Year (vs. Alexander Gustafsson) (UFC 165)
Wrestling Observer Newsletter
2014 Feud of the Year vs. Daniel Cormier
2011 Most Outstanding Fighter
Spike Guys' Choice Awards
2011 Most Dangerous Man
FIGHT! Magazine
2009 Newcomer of the Year

Amateur wrestling
National Junior College Athletic Association
NJCAA 197 lb National Championship out of Iowa Central Community College (2006)
NJCAA All-American out of Iowa Central Community College (2006)
National High School Coaches Association
NHSCA Senior All-American (2005)
New York State Public High School Athletic Association
NYSPHSAA Division I State Championship out of Union-Endicott High School (2005)
USA Wrestling
Northeast Junior Greco-Roman Regional Championship (2004)

Mixed martial arts record

|-
|Win
|align=center|27–1 (1)
|Ciryl Gane
|Submission (guillotine choke)
|UFC 285
|
|align=center|1
|align=center|2:04
|Las Vegas, Nevada, United States
|
|-
|Win
|align=center|26–1 (1)
|Dominick Reyes
|Decision (unanimous)
|UFC 247
|
|align=center|5
|align=center|5:00
|Houston, Texas, United States
|
|-
|Win
|align=center|25–1 (1)
|Thiago Santos
|Decision (split)
|UFC 239
|
|align=center|5
|align=center|5:00
|Las Vegas, Nevada, United States
|
|-
|Win
|align=center|24–1 (1)
|Anthony Smith
|Decision (unanimous)
|UFC 235
|
|align=center|5
|align=center|5:00
|Las Vegas, Nevada, United States
|
|-
|Win
|align=center|23–1 (1)
|Alexander Gustafsson
|KO (punches)
|UFC 232
|
|align=center|3
|align=center|2:02
|Inglewood, California, United States
|
|-
|NC
|align=center|
|Daniel Cormier
|NC (overturned by CSAC)
|UFC 214
|
|align=center|3
|align=center|3:01
|Anaheim, California, United States
|
|-
|Win
|align=center|22–1
|Ovince Saint Preux
|Decision (unanimous)
|UFC 197
|
|align=center|5
|align=center|5:00
|Las Vegas, Nevada, United States
|
|-
|Win
|align=center|21–1
|Daniel Cormier
|Decision (unanimous)
|UFC 182
|
|align=center|5
|align=center|5:00
|Las Vegas, Nevada, United States
|
|-
|Win
|align=center|20–1
|Glover Teixeira
|Decision (unanimous)
|UFC 172
|
|align=center| 5
|align=center| 5:00
|Baltimore, Maryland, United States
|
|-
|Win
|align=center|19–1
|Alexander Gustafsson
|Decision (unanimous)
|UFC 165
|
|align=center| 5
|align=center| 5:00
|Toronto, Ontario, Canada
|
|-
|Win
|align=center|18–1
|Chael Sonnen
|TKO (elbows and punches)
|UFC 159
|
|align=center|1
|align=center|4:33
|Newark, New Jersey, United States
|
|-
| Win
|align=center| 17–1
|Vitor Belfort
|Submission (keylock)
|UFC 152
|
|align=center| 4
|align=center| 0:54
|Toronto, Ontario, Canada
|
|-
|Win
|align=center| 16–1
|Rashad Evans
|Decision (unanimous)
|UFC 145
|
|align=center| 5
|align=center| 5:00
|Atlanta, Georgia, United States
|
|-
|Win
|align=center| 15–1
|Lyoto Machida
|Technical Submission (guillotine choke)
|UFC 140
|
|align=center| 2
|align=center| 4:26
|Toronto, Ontario, Canada
|
|-
|Win
|align=center| 14–1
|Quinton Jackson
|Submission (rear-naked choke)
|UFC 135
|
|align=center| 4
|align=center| 1:14
|Denver, Colorado, United States
|
|-
|Win
|align=center| 13–1
|Maurício Rua
|TKO (punches and knees)
|UFC 128
|
|align=center| 3
|align=center| 2:37
|Newark, New Jersey, United States
|
|-
|Win
|align=center| 12–1
|Ryan Bader
|Submission (guillotine choke)
|UFC 126
|
|align=center| 2
|align=center| 4:20
|Las Vegas, Nevada, United States
|
|-
|Win
|align=center| 11–1
|Vladimir Matyushenko
|TKO (elbows)
|UFC Live: Jones vs. Matyushenko
|
|align=center| 1
|align=center| 1:52
|San Diego, California, United States
|
|-
|Win
|align=center| 10–1
|Brandon Vera
|TKO (elbows and punches)
|UFC Live: Vera vs. Jones
|
|align=center| 1
|align=center| 3:19
|Broomfield, Colorado, United States
|
|-
|Loss
|align=center| 9–1
|Matt Hamill
|DQ (illegal elbows)
||The Ultimate Fighter: Heavyweights Finale
|
|align=center| 1
|align=center| 4:14
|Las Vegas, Nevada, United States
|
|-
|Win
|align=center| 9–0
|Jake O'Brien
|Submission (guillotine choke)
|UFC 100
|
|align=center| 2
|align=center| 2:43
|Las Vegas, Nevada, United States
|
|-
|Win
|align=center| 8–0
|Stephan Bonnar
|Decision (unanimous)
|UFC 94
|
|align=center| 3
|align=center| 5:00
|Las Vegas, Nevada, United States
|
|-
|Win
|align=center| 7–0
|André Gusmão
|Decision (unanimous)
|UFC 87
|
|align=center| 3
|align=center| 5:00
|Minneapolis, Minnesota, United States
|
|-
|Win
|align=center| 6–0
|Moyses Gabin
|TKO (punches)
|Battle Cage Xtreme 5
|
|align=center| 2
|align=center| 1:58
|Atlantic City, New Jersey, United States
|
|-
|Win
|align=center| 5–0
|Parker Porter
|KO (punch)
|World Championship Fighting 3
|
|align=center| 1
|align=center| 0:36
|Wilmington, Massachusetts, United States
|
|-
|Win
|align=center| 4–0
|Ryan Verrett
|TKO (punches)
|USFL: War in the Woods 3
|
|align=center| 1
|align=center| 0:14
|Ledyard, Connecticut, United States
|
|-
|Win
|align=center| 3–0
|Anthony Pina
|Submission (guillotine choke)
|Ice Fighter
|
|align=center| 1
|align=center| 1:15
|Worcester, Massachusetts, United States
|
|-
|Win
|align=center| 2–0
|Carlos Eduardo
|KO (punches)
|Battle Cage Xtreme 4
|
|align=center| 3
|align=center| 0:24
|Atlantic City, New Jersey, United States
|
|-
|Win
|align=center| 1–0
|Brad Bernard
|TKO (punches)
|FFP: Untamed 20
|
|align=center| 1
|align=center| 1:32
|Boxborough, Massachusetts, United States
|

Source:

Grappling record

Pay-per-view bouts

See also
List of current UFC fighters
List of male mixed martial artists
List of UFC champions
List of UFC bonus award recipients
Ultimate Fighting Championship Pound for Pound rankings

References

External links

 
 

|-

|-

|-

1987 births
Living people
African-American Christians
African-American mixed martial artists
American male mixed martial artists
American Muay Thai practitioners
American male sport wrestlers
American practitioners of Brazilian jiu-jitsu
Light heavyweight mixed martial artists
Mixed martial artists utilizing collegiate wrestling
Mixed martial artists utilizing Greco-Roman wrestling
Mixed martial artists utilizing Gaidojutsu
Mixed martial artists utilizing Muay Thai
Mixed martial artists utilizing Brazilian jiu-jitsu
Mixed martial artists from New York (state)
American sportspeople in doping cases
Doping cases in mixed martial arts
Submission grapplers
Sportspeople from Rochester, New York
Ultimate Fighting Championship champions
People from Endicott, New York
Morrisville State College alumni
Ultimate Fighting Championship male fighters
21st-century African-American sportspeople
20th-century African-American people